Piesacus is a genus of beetles in the family Cerambycidae, containing the following species:

 Piesacus exiguus Galileo, 1987
 Piesacus magnus Galileo, 1987

References

Prioninae